A power exchange may refer to:

 the entity that operates an electricity market at which electricity is traded
 Power exchange (BDSM), a lifestyle practised within BDSM